Molise is a comune (municipality) in the Province of Campobasso in the Italian region Molise, located about  northwest of Campobasso.

Molise borders the following municipalities: Duronia, Frosolone, Torella del Sannio.

Demographic evolution

References

Cities and towns in Molise